Beacon Falls station is a commuter rail stop on the Waterbury Branch of the Metro-North Railroad's New Haven Line, located in Beacon Falls, Connecticut. With just 14 daily passengers, the station is one of the least used stations in the entire Metro-North system.

Station layout
The station has one low-level side platform to the east of the single track, long enough for one door of one car to receive and discharge passengers.

The station is owned and operated by the Connecticut Department of Transportation, but Metro-North is responsible for maintaining platform lighting as well as trash and snow removal. The station has 28 parking spaces operated by the town of Beacon Falls.

References

External links

Connecticut Department of Transportation "Condition Inspection for the Naugatuck Station" July 2002

Beacon Falls, Connecticut
Stations along New York, New Haven and Hartford Railroad lines
Metro-North Railroad stations in Connecticut
Railroad stations in New Haven County, Connecticut
Transportation in New Haven County, Connecticut